NGC 5775  is a spiral galaxy, a member of the Virgo Cluster, that lies at a distance of about 70 million light-years. Although the spiral is tilted away from us, with only a thin sliver in view, such a perspective can be advantageous for astronomers. For instance, astronomers have previously used the high inclination of this spiral to study the properties of the halo of hot gas that is visible when the galaxy is observed at X-ray wavelengths. It is a member of the NGC 5775 Group of galaxies, itself one of the Virgo III Groups strung out to the east of the Virgo Supercluster of galaxies.

Interaction with NGC 5774 
NGC 5775 is interacting with the nearby galaxy NGC 5774 in the form of two connecting H I bridges through which the gas is travelling from NGC 5774 to NGC 5775.
Faint optical emission as well as radio continuum emission are also present along the bridges. 
It is possible that star formation is occurring between the galaxies.

This system may be in the early stages of a merger.

Gallery

References

External links 
 
 Galactic Fountain of Youth: ESA/Hubble Picture of the week.

Spiral galaxies
09579
053247
5775
Virgo (constellation)